The Global 200 is the list of ecoregions identified by the World Wide Fund for Nature (WWF), the global conservation organization, as priorities for conservation. According to WWF, an ecoregion is defined as a "relatively large unit of land or water containing a characteristic set of natural communities that share a large majority of their species dynamics, and environmental conditions". For example, based on their levels of endemism, Madagascar gets multiple listings, ancient Lake Baikal gets one, and the North American Great Lakes get none. 

The WWF assigns a conservation status to each ecoregion in the Global 200: critical or endangered; vulnerable; and relatively stable or intact. Over half of the ecoregions in the Global 200 are rated endangered.

Background
The WWF has identified 867 terrestrial ecoregions across the Earth's land surface, as well as freshwater and marine ecoregions. The goal of this classification system is to ensure that the full range of ecosystems will be represented in regional conservation and development strategies. Of these ecoregions, the WWF selected the Global 200 as the ecoregions most crucial to the conservation of global biodiversity. The Global 200 list actually contains 238 ecoregions, made up of 142 terrestrial, 53 freshwater, and 43 marine ecoregions.

Conservationists interested in preserving biodiversity have generally focused on the preservation of tropical moist broadleaf forests (commonly known as tropical rainforests) because it is estimated that they harbor one half of Earth's species. On the other hand, the WWF determined that a more comprehensive strategy for conserving global biodiversity should also consider the other half of species, as well as the ecosystems that support them.

Several habitats, such as Mediterranean forests, woodlands, and scrub biome, were determined to be more threatened than tropical rain forests, and therefore require concerted conservation action. WWF maintains that "although conservation action typically takes place at the country level, patterns of biodiversity and ecological processes (e.g., migration) do not conform to political boundaries", which is why ecoregion-based conservation strategies are deemed essential.

Classification
Historically, zoologists and botanists have developed various classification systems that take into account the world's plant and animal communities. Two of the worldwide classification systems most commonly used today were summarized by Miklos Udvardy in 1975.

The Earth's land surface can be divided into eight biogeographic realms (formerly called kingdoms, and which the BBC calls ecozones) that represent the major terrestrial communities of animals and plants, and are a synthesis of previous systems of floristic provinces and faunal regions. The biome system classifies the world into ecosystem types (i.e. forests, grasslands, etc.) based on climate and vegetation. Each biogeographical realm contains multiple biomes, and biomes occur across several biogeographical realms. A system of biogeographical provinces was developed to identify specific geographic areas in each biogeographical realm that were of a consistent biome type, and shared distinct plant and animal communities. The WWF system represents a further refinement of the system of biomes (which the WWF calls "major habitat types"), biogeographical realms, and biogeographical provinces (the WWF scheme divides most biogeographical provinces into multiple smaller ecoregions).

Selection process
Based on a comprehensive list of ecoregions, The Global 200 includes all major habitat types (biomes), all ecosystem types, and species from every major habitat type. It focuses on each major habitat type of every continent (such as tropical forests or coral reefs). It uses ecoregions as the unit of scale for comparison. WWF say ecoregions could be considered as conservation units at regional scale because they meet similar biological communities.

Some ecoregions were selected over other ecoregions of the same major habitat type (biome) or realm. Selection of the Global 200 relied on extensive studies of 19 terrestrial, freshwater, and marine major habitat types. Selection of the ecoregions was based on analyses of species richness, species endemism, unique higher taxa, unusual ecological or evolutionary phenomena, and global rarity of major habitat type.

Global 200 ecoregion list is most helpful to conservation efforts at a regional scale: local deforestation, destruction of swamp habitats, degradation of soils, etc. However, certain phenomena, such as bird or whale migration, depend on more complex parameters not used to define the current database, such as atmospheric currents and dynamic pelagic ecosystems. These would require gathering more information, and co-ordination of efforts between multiple ecoregions. However, the Global 200 ecoregions can help these efforts by identifying habitat sites and resting sites for migratory animals. It may also help identify the origin of invasive species, and offer insights for slowing down or stopping their intrusion.

Global 200: Terrestrial

Tropical and subtropical moist broadleaf forests

Afrotropical
Guinean moist forests
AT0111 Eastern Guinean forests
AT0114 Guinean montane forests
AT0130 Western Guinean lowland forests
Congolian coastal forests
AT0102 Atlantic Equatorial coastal forests
AT0107 Cross–Sanaga–Bioko coastal forests
AT0127 São Tomé, Príncipe, and Annobón forests
Cameroon Highlands forests
AT0103 Cameroonian Highlands forests
AT0121 Mount Cameroon and Bioko montane forests
Northeastern Congolian lowland forests
AT0124 Northeastern Congolian lowland forests
Central Congo Basin Moist Forests
AT0104 Central Congolian lowland forests
AT0110 Eastern Congolian swamp forests
Western Congo Basin Moist Forests
AT0126 Northwestern Congolian lowland forests
AT0129 Western Congolian swamp forests
Albertine Rift montane forests
AT0101 Albertine Rift montane forests
East African Coastal Forests
AT0125 Northern Zanzibar–Inhambane coastal forest mosaic
AT0128 Southern Zanzibar–Inhambane coastal forest mosaic
Eastern Arc Montane Forests (Kenya, Tanzania)
AT0109 Eastern Arc forests
Madagascar lowlands and subhumid forests
AT0117 Madagascar lowland forests
AT0118 Madagascar subhumid forests
Seychelles and Mascarene Islands moist forests
AT0113 Granitic Seychelles forests
AT0120 Mascarene forests

Australasia
Sulawesi moist forests
AA0123 Sulawesi lowland rain forests
AA0124 Sulawesi montane rain forests
Moluccas moist forests (Indonesia)
AA0106 Halmahera rain forests
Southern New Guinea lowland forests
AA0122 Southern New Guinea lowland rain forests
New Guinea montane forests
AA0116 Northern New Guinea montane rain forests
Solomons–Vanuatu–Bismarck moist forests
AA0101 Admiralty Islands lowland rain forests
AA0111 New Britain–New Ireland lowland rain forests
AA0112 New Britain–New Ireland montane rain forests
AA0119 Solomon Islands rain forests
AA0126 Vanuatu rain forests
Queensland tropical rain forests
AA0117 Queensland tropical rain forests
New Caledonia moist forests
AA0113 New Caledonia rain forests
Lord Howe–Norfolk Islands forests
AA0109 Lord Howe Island subtropical forests

Indomalaya
South Western Ghats montane rain forests and moist deciduous forests
IM0150 South Western Ghats moist deciduous forests
IM0151 South Western Ghats montane rain forests
Sri Lanka moist forests
IM0154 Sri Lanka lowland rain forests
IM0155 Sri Lanka montane rain forests
Northern Indochina Subtropical moist forests
IM0137 Northern Indochina subtropical forests
Southeast China-Hainan moist forests
IM0149 South China–Vietnam subtropical evergreen forests
IM0169 Hainan Island monsoon rain forests
Taiwan montane forests
IM0172 Taiwan subtropical evergreen forests
Annamite Range moist forests (Cambodia, Laos, Vietnam)
IM0136 Northern Annamites rain forests
IM0152 Southern Annamites montane rain forests
Sumatran Islands lowland and montane forests
IM0157 Sumatran freshwater swamp forests
IM0158 Sumatran lowland rain forests
IM0159 Sumatran montane rain forests
IM0160 Sumatran peat swamp forests
Philippines moist forests
IM0114 Greater Negros–Panay rain forests
IM0122 Luzon montane rain forests
IM0123 Luzon rain forests
IM0128 Mindanao montane rain forests
IM0129 Mindanao–Eastern Visayas rain forests
IM0130 Mindoro rain forests
IM0156 Sulu Archipelago rain forests
Palawan moist forests
IM0143 Palawan rain forests
Kayah-Karen/Tenasserim moist forests
IM0119 Kayah–Karen montane rain forests
IM0163 Tenasserim–South Thailand semi-evergreen rain forests
Peninsular Malaysian lowland and montane forests
IM0144 Peninsular Malaysian montane rain forests
IM0145 Peninsular Malaysian peat swamp forests
IM0146 Peninsular Malaysian rain forests
Borneo lowland and montane forests
IM0102 Borneo lowland rain forests
IM0103 Borneo montane rain forests
IM0104 Borneo peat swamp forests
Nansei Shoto Archipelago forests (Japan)
IM0170 Nansei Islands subtropical evergreen forests
Eastern Deccan Plateau moist forests (India)
IM0111 Eastern highlands moist deciduous forests
Naga-Manupuri-Chin hills moist forests (Bangladesh, India, Myanmar)
IM0109 Chin Hills–Arakan Yoma montane forests
IM0120 Lower Gangetic Plains moist deciduous forests
IM0131 Mizoram–Manipur–Kachin rain forests
Cardamom Mountains moist forests
IM0106 Cardamom Mountains rain forests
Western Java montane forests
IM0167 Western Java montane rain forests
Maldives–Lakshadweep–Chagos Archipelago tropical moist forests
IM0125 Maldives–Lakshadweep–Chagos Archipelago tropical moist forests

Neotropic
Greater Antillean moist forests
NT0120 Cuban moist forests
NT0127 Hispaniolan moist forests
NT0131 Jamaican moist forests
NT0155 Puerto Rican moist forests
Talamancan-Isthmian Pacific forests
NT0167 Talamancan montane forests
Choco–Darien moist forests
NT0115 Chocó–Darién moist forests
Northern Andean montane forests
NT0145 Northwestern Andean montane forests
Coastal Venezuela montane forests
NT0147 Orinoco Delta swamp forests
NT0169 Tepuis
NT0171 Trinidad and Tobago moist forests
Guianan moist forests
NT0125 Guianan moist forests
Napo moist forests
NT0142 Napo moist forests
Rio Negro - Juruá moist forests
NT0132 Japurá–Solimões–Negro moist forests
NT0133 Juruá–Purus moist forests
NT0158 Rio Negro campinarana
Guayana Highlands moist forests
NT0124 Guayanan Highlands moist forests
Central Andean yungas
NT0105 Bolivian Yungas
NT0153 Peruvian Yungas
Southwestern Amazonian moist forests
NT0166 Southwest Amazon moist forests
Atlantic forests
NT0103 Bahia coastal forests
NT0151 Pernambuco coastal forests
NT0160 Serra do Mar coastal forests

Oceania
South Pacific Islands forests (American Samoa - United States, Cook Islands - New Zealand, Fiji, French Polynesia - France, Niue - New Zealand, Samoa, Tonga, Wallis and Futuna Islands - France)
OC0102 Central Polynesian tropical moist forests
OC0103 Cook Islands tropical moist forests
OC0104 Eastern Micronesia tropical moist forests
OC0105 Fiji tropical moist forests
OC0112 Samoan tropical moist forests
OC0114 Tongan tropical moist forests
OC0117 Western Polynesian tropical moist forests
Hawaii moist forests
OC0106 Hawaiian tropical rainforests

Tropical and subtropical dry broadleaf forests

Afrotropic
Madagascar dry deciduous forests
AT0202 Madagascar dry deciduous forests

Australasia
Nusa Tenggara Dry Forests (Indonesia)
AA0201 Lesser Sundas deciduous forests
AA0203 Sumba deciduous forests
AA0204 Timor and Wetar deciduous forests
New Caledonia dry forests
AA0202 New Caledonia dry forests

Indomalaya
Indochina dry forests
IM0202 Central Indochina dry forests
Chhota - Nagpur dry forests
IM0203 Chota Nagpur dry deciduous forests

Neotropic
Mexican dry forests
NT0204 Bajio dry forests
NT0205 Balsas dry forests
NT0227 Sierra de la Laguna dry forests
Tumbesian - Andean valleys dry forests (Colombia, Ecuador, Peru)
NT0201 Apure–Villavicencio dry forests
NT0214 Ecuadorian dry forests
NT0221 Magdalena Valley dry forests
NT0223 Marañón dry forests
NT0232 Tumbes–Piura dry forests
Chiquitano dry forests
NT0212 Chiquitano dry forests
Atlantic dry forests
NT0202 Atlantic dry forests

Oceania
Hawaii dry forests
OC0202 Hawaiian tropical dry forests

Tropical and subtropical coniferous forests

Nearctic
Sierra Madre Oriental and Occidental pine-oak forests
NA0302 Sierra Madre Occidental pine–oak forests
NA0303 Sierra Madre Oriental pine–oak forests

Neotropic
Greater Antillean pine forests
NT0304 Cuban pine forests
NT0305 Hispaniolan pine forests
Mesoamerican pine–oak forests (El Salvador, Guatemala, Honduras, Mexico, Nicaragua)
NT0308 Sierra Madre de Oaxaca pine–oak forests
NT0309 Sierra Madre del Sur pine–oak forests
NT0310 Trans-Mexican Volcanic Belt pine–oak forests

Temperate broadleaf and mixed forests

Australasia
Eastern Australia temperate forests
AA0402 Eastern Australian temperate forests
Tasmanian temperate rain forests
AA0413 Tasmanian temperate rain forests
New Zealand temperate forests
AA0403 Fiordland temperate forests
AA0404 Nelson Coast temperate forests
AA0405 Northland temperate forests
AA0406 Northland temperate kauri forests
AA0407 Rakiura Island temperate forests
AA0410 Southland temperate forests
AA0414 Westland temperate forests

Indomalaya
Eastern Himalayan broadleaf and conifer forests
IM0401 Eastern Himalayan broadleaf forests
Western Himalayan temperate forests
IM0403 Western Himalayan broadleaf forests

Nearctic
Appalachian and mixed mesophytic forests
NA0402 Appalachian mixed mesophytic forests

Neotropic
Valdivian temperate rain forests - Juan Fernández Islands
NT0401 Juan Fernández Islands temperate forests
NT0404 Valdivian temperate forests

Palearctic
Southwest China temperate forests
PA0417 Daba Mountains evergreen forests
PA0434 Qin Ling Mountains deciduous forests
PA0437 Sichuan Basin evergreen broadleaf forests
Russian Far East temperate forests
PA0426 Manchurian mixed forests
PA0443 Ussuri broadleaf and mixed forests

Temperate coniferous forests

Nearctic
Pacific temperate rain forests
NA0510 Central Pacific coastal forests
NA0512 Eastern Cascades forests
NA0520 Northern Pacific coastal forests
Klamath - Siskiyou forests
NA0516 Klamath-Siskiyou forests
Sierra Nevada forests
NA0527 Sierra Nevada forests
Southeastern coniferous and broadleaf forests
NA0529 Southeastern conifer forests

Palearctic
European - Mediterranean montane mixed forests
PA0501 Alps conifer and mixed forests
PA0513 Mediterranean conifer and mixed forests
Caucasus-Anatolian-Hyrcanian temperate forest (Armenia, Azerbaijan, Bulgaria, Georgia, Iran, Russia, Turkey, Turkmenistan)
PA0407 Caspian Hyrcanian mixed forests
PA0408 Caucasus mixed forests
PA0507 Elburz Range forest steppe
PA0515 Northern Anatolian conifer and deciduous forests
Altai - Sayan montane forests
PA0502 Altai montane forest and forest steppe
PA0519 Sayan montane conifer forests
Hengduan Shan coniferous forests
PA0509 Hengduan Mountains subalpine conifer forests

Boreal forests/taiga

Nearctic
Muskwa / Slave Lake boreal forests
NA0610 Muskwa–Slave Lake forests
Canadian Boreal Forests
NA0606 Eastern Canadian Shield taiga

Palearctic
Ural Mountains taiga
PA0610 Urals montane tundra and taiga
East Siberian taiga
PA0601 East Siberian taiga
Kamchatka taiga and grasslands
PA0603 Kamchatka–Kurile meadows and sparse forests
PA0604 Kamchatka–Kurile taiga

Tropical and subtropical grasslands, savannas, and shrublands

Afrotropic
Horn of Africa acacia savannas
AT0715 Somali Acacia–Commiphora bushlands and thickets
East African acacia savannas
AT0711 Northern Acacia–Commiphora bushlands and thickets
Central and Eastern miombo woodlands
AT0704 Central Zambezian miombo woodlands
AT0706 Eastern miombo woodlands
Sudanian savannas
AT0705 East Sudanian savanna
AT0722 West Sudanian savanna

Australasia
Northern Australia and Trans-Fly savannas
AA0701 Arnhem Land tropical savanna
AA0702 Brigalow tropical savanna
AA0703 Cape York tropical savanna
AA0704 Carpentaria tropical savanna
AA0705 Einasleigh upland savanna
AA0706 Kimberley tropical savanna
AA0708 Trans-Fly savanna and grasslands

Indomalaya
Terai-Duar savannas and grasslands
IM0701 Terai–Duar savanna and grasslands

Neotropic
Llanos savannas
NT0709 Llanos
Cerrado woodlands and savannas
NT0704 Cerrado

Temperate grasslands, savannas, and shrublands

Australasia
Central Range subalpine grasslands
AA1002 Central Range sub-alpine grasslands

Nearctic
Northern prairie
NA0810 Northern mixed grasslands
NA0811 Northern short grasslands
NA0812 Northern tall grasslands

Neotropic
Patagonian steppe
NT0805 Patagonian steppe

Palearctic
Daurian steppe
PA0804 Daurian forest steppe

Flooded grasslands and savannas

Afrotropic
Sudd - Sahelian flooded grasslands and savannas (Cameroon, Chad, Ethiopia, Mali, Niger, Nigeria, Sudan, Uganda)
AT0903 Inner Niger Delta flooded savanna
AT0904 Lake Chad flooded savanna
AT0905 Saharan flooded grasslands
Zambezian flooded savannas
AT0907 Zambezian flooded grasslands

Indomalaya
Rann of Kutch flooded grasslands
IM0901 Rann of Kutch seasonal salt marsh

Neotropic
Everglades flooded grasslands
NT0904 Everglades
Pantanal flooded savannas
NT0907 Pantanal

Montane grasslands and shrublands

Afrotropic
Ethiopian Highlands
AT1007 Ethiopian montane grasslands and woodlands
AT1008 Ethiopian montane moorlands
Southern Rift montane woodlands
AT1015 Southern Rift montane forest–grassland mosaic
East African moorlands
AT1005 East African montane moorlands
Drakensberg montane shrublands and woodlands
AT1003 Drakensberg alti-montane grasslands and woodlands
AT1004 Drakensberg montane grasslands, woodlands and forests

Australasian
 New Guinea Central Range subalpine grasslands

Indomalaya
Kinabalu montane shrublands
IM1001 Kinabalu montane alpine meadows

Neotropic
Northern Andean páramo
NT1006 Northern Andean páramo
Central Andean dry puna
NT1001 Central Andean dry puna

Palearctic
Tibetan Plateau steppe
PA1020 Tibetan Plateau alpine shrublands and meadows
Middle Asian montane steppe and woodlands (Afghanistan, China, Kazakhstan, Kyrgyzstan, Tajikistan, Turkmenistan, Uzbekistan)
PA1011 North Tibetan Plateau–Kunlun Mountains alpine desert
PA1015 Qilian Mountains subalpine meadows
PA1013 Ordos Plateau steppe
Eastern Himalayan alpine meadows
PA1003 Eastern Himalayan alpine shrub and meadows

Tundra

Nearctic
Alaskan North Slope coastal tundra (Canada, United States)
NA1103 Arctic coastal tundra
NA1104 Arctic foothills tundra
NA1108 Brooks–British Range tundra
Canadian low arctic tundra (Canada)
NA1114 Low Arctic tundra
NA1116 Ogilvie–MacKenzie alpine tundra
NA1118 Torngat Mountain tundra

Palearctic
Fenno - Scandia alpine tundra and taiga (Finland, Norway, Russia, Sweden)
PA1106 Kola Peninsula tundra
PA1110 Scandinavian montane birch forest and grasslands
Taimyr and Siberian coastal tundra
PA1107 Northeast Siberian coastal tundra
PA1111 Taimyr–Central Siberian tundra
Chukote coastal tundra (Russia)
PA1104 Chukchi Peninsula tundra

Mediterranean forests, woodlands, and scrub

Afrotropic
Fynbos
AT1202 Lowland fynbos and renosterveld
AT1203 Montane fynbos and renosterveld

Australasia
Southwestern Australia forests and scrub
AA1201 Coolgardie woodlands
AA1202 Esperance mallee
AA1209 Southwest Australia savanna
AA1210 Southwest Australia woodlands
Southern Australia mallee and woodlands
AA1203 Eyre and York mallee
AA1206 Mount Lofty woodlands
AA1208 Naracoorte woodlands

Nearctic
California chaparral and woodlands
NA1201 California coastal sage and chaparral
NA1202 California interior chaparral and woodlands
NA1203 California montane chaparral and woodlands

Neotropic
Chilean Matorral
NT1201 Chilean Matorral

Palearctic
Mediterranean forests, woodlands, and scrub
PA1214 Mediterranean woodlands and forests

Deserts and xeric shrublands

Afrotropic
Namib - Karoo - Kaokoveld deserts (Angola, Namibia, South Africa)
AT1310 Kaokoveld desert
AT1314 Nama Karoo
AT1315 Namib desert
AT1322 Succulent Karoo
Madagascar spiny thicket
AT1311 Madagascar spiny thickets
Socotra Island desert (Yemen)
AT1318 Socotra Island xeric shrublands
Arabian Highland woodlands and shrublands (Oman, Saudi Arabia, United Arab Emirates, Yemen)
AT1320 Southwestern Arabian foothills savanna
AT1321 Southwestern Arabian montane woodlands

Australasia
Carnavon xeric scrub
AA1301 Carnarvon xeric shrublands
Great Sandy - Tanami deserts
AA1304 Great Sandy-Tanami desert

Nearctic
Sonoran - Baja deserts
NA1301 Baja California Desert
NA1310 Sonoran Desert
Chihuahuan - Tehuacan deserts
NA1303 Chihuahuan Desert

Neotropic
Galápagos Islands scrub
NT1307 Galápagos Islands xeric scrub
Atacama - Sechura deserts
NT1303 Atacama Desert
NT1315 Sechura Desert
Brazilian Atlantic Dry Forests (NT15):
NT15 525 Caatinga

Palearctic
Central Asian deserts (Kazakhstan, Kyrgyzstan, Uzbekistan, Turkmenistan)
PA1310 Central Asian northern desert
PA1312 Central Asian southern desert

Mangroves

Afrotropic
East African mangroves
AT1402 East African mangroves
Gulf of Guinea mangroves
AT1403 Guinean mangroves
Madagascar mangroves
AT1404 Madagascar mangroves

Australasia
New Guinea mangroves
AA1401 New Guinea mangroves

Indomalaya
Greater Sundas mangroves
IM1405 Sunda Shelf mangroves
Sundarbans mangroves
IM1406 Sundarbans mangroves

Nearctic
Northwest Mexican coast mangroves
NA1401 Northwest Mexican coast mangroves

Neotropic
Guianan - Amazon mangroves
NT1401 Alvarado mangroves
NT1402 Amapá mangroves
NT1406 Belizean reef mangroves
NT1411 Guianan mangroves
NT1427 Pará mangroves
Panama Bight mangroves
NT1414 Gulf of Panama mangroves
NT1409 Esmeraldas–Pacific Colombia mangroves
NT1418 Manabí mangroves
NT1413 Gulf of Guayaquil–Tumbes mangroves

Global 200: Freshwater ecoregions

Large rivers

Afrotropic
Congo River and flooded forests (Angola, Democratic Republic of Congo, Republic of Congo)

Indomalaya
Mekong River (Cambodia, China, Laos, Myanmar, Thailand, Vietnam)

Nearctic
Colorado River (Mexico, United States)
Lower Mississippi River (United States)

Neotropic
Amazon River and flooded forests (Brazil, Colombia, Peru)
Orinoco River and flooded forests (Brazil, Colombia, Venezuela)

Palearctic
Yangtze River and lakes (China)

Large river headwaters

Afrotropic
Congo basin piedmont rivers and streams (Angola, Cameroon, Central African Republic, Democratic Republic of Congo, Gabon, Republic of Congo, Sudan)

Nearctic
Mississippi piedmont rivers and streams (United States)

Neotropic
Upper Amazon rivers and streams (Bolivia, Brazil, Colombia, Ecuador, French Guiana (France), Guyana, Peru, Suriname, Venezuela)
Upper Paraná rivers and streams (Argentina, Brazil, Paraguay)
Brazilian Shield Amazonian rivers and streams (Bolivia, Brazil, Paraguay)

Large river deltas

Afrotropic
Niger River delta (Nigeria)

Indomalaya
Indus River Delta (India, Pakistan)

Palearctic
Volga River Delta (Kazakhstan, Russia)
Mesopotamian delta and marshes (Iran, Iraq, Kuwait)
Danube River delta (Bulgaria, Moldova, Romania, Ukraine, Yugoslavia)
Lena River delta (Russia)

Small rivers

Afrotropic
Upper Guinea rivers and streams (Côte d'Ivoire, Guinea, Liberia, Sierra Leone)
Madagascar freshwater (Madagascar)
Gulf of Guinea rivers and streams (Angola, Cameroon, Democratic Republic of Congo, Equatorial Guinea, Gabon, Nigeria, Republic of Congo)
Cape rivers and streams (South Africa)

Australasia
New Guinea rivers and streams (Indonesia, Papua New Guinea)
New Caledonia rivers and streams (New Caledonia)
Kimberley rivers and streams (Australia)
Southwest Australia rivers and streams (Australia)
Eastern Australia rivers and streams (Australia)

Indomalaya
Xi Jiang rivers and streams (China, Vietnam)
Western Ghats Rivers and Streams (India)
Southwestern Sri Lanka rivers and streams (Sri Lanka)
Salween River (China, Myanmar, Thailand)
Sundaland rivers and swamps (Brunei, Malaysia, Indonesia, Singapore)

Nearctic
Southeastern rivers and streams (United States)
Pacific Northwest coastal rivers and streams (United States)
Gulf of Alaska coastal rivers and streams (Canada, United States)

Neotropic
Guianan freshwater (Brazil, French Guiana, Guyana, Suriname, Venezuela)
Greater Antillean freshwater (Cuba, Dominican Republic, Haiti, Puerto Rico)

Palearctic
Balkan rivers and streams (Albania, Bosnia and Herzogovina, Bulgaria, Croatia, Greece, Macedonia, Turkey, Yugoslavia)
Russian Far East rivers and wetlands (China, Mongolia, Russia)

Large lakes

Afrotropic
Rift Valley lakes (Burundi, Democratic Republic of Congo, Ethiopia, Kenya, Malawi, Mozambique, Rwanda, Tanzania, Uganda, Zambia)

Neotropic
High Andean lakes (Argentina, Bolivia, Chile, Peru)

Palearctic
Lake Baikal (Russia)
Lake Biwa (Japan)

Small lakes

Afrotropic
Cameroon crater lakes (Cameroon)

Australasia
Lakes Kutubu and Sentani (Indonesia, Papua New Guinea)
Central Sulawesi lakes (Indonesia)

Indomalaya
Philippines freshwater (Philippines)
Inle Lake (Myanmar)
Yunnan lakes and streams (China)

Neotropic
Mexican highland lakes (Mexico)

Xeric basins

Australasia
Central Australian freshwater (Australia)

Nearctic
Chihuahuan freshwater (Mexico, United States)

Palearctic
Anatolian freshwater (Syria, Turkey)

Global 200 Marine ecoregions

Polar

Antarctic Ocean
Antarctic Peninsula & Weddell Sea

Arctic Ocean
Bering Sea (Canada, Russia, United States)
Barents-Kara Sea (Norway, Russia)

Temperate shelves and seas

Mediterranean Sea
Mediterranean (Albania, Algeria, Bosnia and Herzegovina, Croatia, Cyprus, Egypt, France, Greece, Israel, Italy, Lebanon, Libya, Malta, Monaco, Morocco, Serbia & Montenegro, Slovenia, Spain, Syria, Tunisia, Turkey)

Temperate Northern Atlantic
Northeast Atlantic Shelf Marine (Belgium, Denmark, Estonia, Finland, France, Germany, Ireland, Latvia, Lithuania, Netherlands, Norway, Poland, Russia, Sweden, United Kingdom)
Grand Banks (Canada, St. Pierre and Miquelon (France), United States)
Chesapeake Bay (United States)

Temperate Northern Pacific
Yellow Sea (China, North Korea, South Korea)
Sea of Okhotsk (Japan, Russia)

Southern Ocean
Patagonian Southwest Atlantic (Argentina, Brazil, Chile, Uruguay)
Southern Australian Marine (Australia)
New Zealand Marine (New Zealand)

Temperate upwelling

North Temperate Indo-Pacific
California Current (Canada, Mexico, United States)

South Temperate Atlantic
Benguela Current (Namibia, South Africa)

South Temperate Indo-Pacific
Humboldt Current (Chile, Ecuador, Peru)
Agulhas Current (Mozambique, South Africa)

Tropical upwelling

Central Indo-Pacific
Western Australian Marine (Australia)

Eastern Indo-Pacific
Panama Bight (Colombia, Ecuador, Panama)
Gulf of California (Mexico)
Galápagos Marine (Ecuador)

Eastern Tropical Atlantic
Canary Current (Canary Islands, Gambia, Guinea-Bissau, Mauritania, Morocco, Senegal, Western Sahara)

Tropical coral

Central Indo-Pacific
Nansei Shoto (Ryukyu Islands) (Japan)
Sulu-Sulawesi Seas (Indonesia, Malaysia, Philippines)
Bismarck-Solomon Seas (Indonesia, Papua New Guinea, Solomon Islands)
Banda-Flores Sea (Indonesia)
New Caledonia Barrier Reef (New Caledonia)
Great Barrier Reef (Australia)
Lord Howe-Norfolk Islands Marine (Australia)
Palau Marine (Palau)
Andaman Sea (Andaman and Nicobar Islands (India), Indonesia, Malaysia, Myanmar, Thailand)

Eastern Indo-Pacific
Tahitian Marine (Cook Islands, French Polynesia)
Hawaiian Marine (Hawaii)
Rapa Nui (Easter Island)
Fiji Barrier Reef (Fiji)

Western Indo-Pacific
Maldives, Chagos, and Lakshadweep atolls (Chagos Archipelago (United Kingdom), India, Maldives, Sri Lanka)
Red Sea (Djibouti, Egypt, Eritrea, Israel, Jordan, Saudi Arabia, Sudan, Yemen)
Arabian Sea (Djibouti, Iran, Oman, Pakistan, Qatar, Saudi Arabia, Somalia, United Arab Emirates, Yemen)
East African Marine (Kenya, Mozambique, Somalia, Tanzania)
West Madagascar Marine (Comoros, Madagascar, Mayotte and Iles Glorieuses (France), Seychelles)

Western Tropical Atlantic
Mesoamerican Barrier Reef System (Belize, Guatemala, Honduras, Mexico)
Greater Antillean Marine (Bahamas, Cayman Islands, Cuba, Dominican Republic, Haiti, Jamaica, Puerto Rico, Turks and Caicos Islands, United States)
Southern Caribbean Sea (Aruba, Colombia, Netherlands Antilles, Panama, Trinidad and Tobago, Venezuela)
Northeast Brazil Shelf Marine (Brazil)

Global Priority Places 
WWF WWF has identified 35 global priority places around the world (terrestrial, freshwater and marine) as either being home to irreplaceable and threatened biodiversity, or representing an opportunity to conserve the largest and most intact representative of their ecosystem.
 African Rift Lakes Region - Include the 3 largest lakes in Africa: Victoria, Tanganyika and Malawi, as well as lakes Turkana, Albert, Edward, Kivu and others.
 Altai-Sayan Montane Forests - One of the last remaining untouched areas of the world 
 Amazon Guianas - World's largest tropical rain forest and river basin with a mosaic of mountains, coniferous forests, steppe and alpine meadows. 
 Amur-Heilong - Refuge for Amur leopard and tiger.
 Arctic Seas & Associated Boreal/Tundra - Protecting Arctic Environments
 Atlantic Forests - Forest stretches from the Atlantic coast of Brazil, south along the Brazilian Atlantic coastline and inland into northeast Argentina and eastern Paraguay.
 Borneo and Sumatra - Priceless forests harbor untold species
 Cerrado-Pantanal
 Chihuahuan Desert - Protecting the balance of a desert
 Chocó–Darién
 Coastal East Africa - Improving livelihoods by conserving nature
 Congo Basin - Protecting Africa's tropical forests
 Coral Triangle - Home to the world's most abundant variety of corals and sea life
 Eastern Himalayas - Empowering communities to protect sacred lands
 Fynbos
 The Galápagos - The world's most treasured islands
 Greater Black Sea Basin
 Lake Baikal
 Madagascar - Safeguarding one of Earth's most captivating islands
 Mediterranean Sea
 Mekong Complex - Protecting the river of life from source to sea
 Miombo woodlands
 Namib-Karoo-Kaokoveld
 New Guinea & Offshore Islands
 Northern Great Plains
 Orinoco River & Flooded Forests
 Southeastern Rivers and Streams
 Southern Chile - A land of ancient forests and abundant oceans
 Southern Ocean
 Southwest Australia
 Southwest Pacific
 Sumatra
 West Africa Marine
 Western Ghats
 Yangtze Basin - Sustaining a valley of life

Gallery

See also 
Biodiversity hotspots
Megadiverse countries
Arid Forest Research Institute (AFRI)

References

External links 
A-Z of Areas of Biodiversity Importance: Global 200 Ecoregions
Map of the Global 200
Conservation status map of the global 200
List of the Global 200
Map of Ecoregions
Global Priority Places

WWF ecoregions
Ecology lists
Environmental conservation
Lists of places
Top lists